Just Friends is an album by saxophonist Zoot Sims (credited on the original release as John Haley Sims) with trumpeter Harry Sweets Edison recorded in late 1978 but not released by the Pablo label until 1980.

Reception

AllMusic reviewer Scott Yanow stated "Although from different generations, tenor-saxophonist Zoot Sims and trumpeter Harry 'Sweets' Edison both always liked to swing, making their successful collaboration on this CD reissue not much of a surprise ... The results are predictable but colorful and inventive within the boundaries of the idiom".

Track listing
 "Nature Boy" (eden ahbez) – 5:38
 "How Deep Is the Ocean?" (Irving Berlin) – 6:52
 "My Heart Belongs to Daddy" (Cole Porter) – 5:02
 "I Understand" (Mabel Wayne, Kim Gannon) – 3:12
 "Just Friends" (John Klenner, Sam M. Lewis) – 5:11
 "Blue Skies" (Berlin) – 6:18
 "Until Tonight (Mauve)" (Victor Young, Edward Heyman) – 4:47
 "A Little Tutu" (Harry Sweets Edison) – 3:42

Personnel 
John Haley Sims – tenor saxophone
Harry Sweets Edison – trumpet
Roger Kellaway – piano
John Heard – bass
Jimmie Smith – drums

References 

1980 albums
Zoot Sims albums
Harry Edison albums
Pablo Records albums
Albums produced by Norman Granz